Ralph Waldo Van Dyke III (born January 19, 1964) is a former American football offensive lineman for the Cleveland Browns of the National Football League. He played college football at Southern Illinois.

Early life 
Ralph Waldo Van Dyke III was born on January 19, 1964, at St. James Hospital in Chicago Heights, Illinois, to Ralph Waldo Van Dyke, Jr. and Mattie Lou Van Dyke.

In addition to playing high school football, Van Dyke played basketball at Bloom High School in Chicago Heights.

College football 
Van Dyke was a redshirt during his freshman year at Southern Illinois in 1982. He became a starter for the team by the fifth game of the 1983 season, and was noted as an "extremely aggressive" hard worker by coach Rod Sherrill in 1983, shortly before the Salukis won the NCAA Division I-AA championship.

In 1986, he made the all-Missouri Valley Conference first-team offense as an offensive tackle, and was an honorable mention on the Associated Press all-American list.

Professional football

Atlanta Falcons 

After a below-average performance at the NFL Scouting Combine, Van Dyke was drafted by the Atlanta Falcons in the fourth round of the 1987 NFL Draft, with the 97th pick overall. He signed with the team in late July 1987, but was waived roughly a month later on August 31.

Cleveland Browns 

During the 1987 NFL strike, Van Dyke signed with the Cleveland Browns as a replacement player, starting at offensive tackle in the team's Week 4 and Week 5 games. The strike ended after Week 6 and Van Dyke was released by the Browns.

Phoenix Cardinals 

Van Dyke signed with the Phoenix Cardinals on March 31, 1988, in the midst of the team's relocation from St. Louis, Missouri to Phoenix, Arizona. He suffered a sprain to his knee in July 1988 during the team's training camp in Flagstaff, requiring him to be sent south to Phoenix for treatment. He left the team's camp on July 28, 1988.

References 

1964 births
Living people
American football offensive tackles
Atlanta Falcons players
Cleveland Browns players
National Football League replacement players
People from Chicago Heights, Illinois
Phoenix Cardinals players
Players of American football from Illinois
Southern Illinois Salukis football players